Mandurah Station is the terminus of the Mandurah railway line and a bus station on the Transperth network, serving the satellite city of Mandurah, Western Australia.

History

The bus station opened prior to the railway station, on 17 September 2003, replacing a temporary bus terminus located nearby in the carpark of Rushton Park.

The railway station later opened on the same site as the bus station, on 23 December 2007 by Premier Alan Carpenter alongside the rest of the Mandurah railway line. The car park was also significantly expanded for the opening of the railway station.

In 2020, construction started on a $32 million multi-storey car park for Mandurah station as part of Metronet. When complete, the car park will add approximately 700 bays, and have three levels. During construction, a temporary car park was built west of Galgoyl Road to replace some of the car bays removed during construction. The car park opened in November 2021.

Services
Mandurah station is served by Transperth Mandurah line services.

Platforms
Mandurah station has the following platform configuration:

Bus routes
The bus services (except for 583, 584, 586 and 590) from Mandurah station commenced on the same day as the regular services on the Mandurah line, 24 December 2007, the Monday after the station and line were opened. 590 was introduced in January 2008  (and withdrawn in December 2011) while 586 was added in April 2010. There is also a free direct shuttle service operating every 20 minutes between the station and the city centre (in contrast to the 588, 589 and 590 which deviate via the Mandurah Forum shopping centre).

A significant change in bus routes occurred on 18 December 2011, which saw the 590 service withdrawn and two new bus routes 583 and 584 replacing the original 588 and 589 services. The two replaced services were rerouted to operate on a loop serving the Mandurah foreshore and the Mandurah Forum. Bus routes in Halls Head, Erksine, Falcon, Wannanup and Dawesville and also changed on 2 March 2014 when route 593 was introduced and route 592 was shortened, terminating in Wannanup.

Mandurah is also served by Transwa services to Perth Coach Terminal and Albany and South West Coach Lines services to Perth Airport, Busselton and Manjimup.

References

External links

Mandurah
Mandurah line
Railway stations in Perth, Western Australia
Railway stations in Australia opened in 2007
Bus stations in Perth, Western Australia